Puttaparthi (IAST: Puṭṭaparthy) is a municipality and district headquarters of Sri Sathya Sai district of the Indian state of Andhra Pradesh. It is located in Puttaparthi mandal of Puttaparthi revenue division. The original name of Puttaparthi was Gollapalli. The town is located on the banks of Chitravathi River which is a tributary of Penna River, and is surrounded by undulating hills. It is widely known for the birthplace of the Indian spiritual leader and guru Sathya Sai Baba and his ashram, Prasanthi Nilayam.

Etymology 
Puttaparthi means "village of anthills." A local legend says that a cobra snake cursed the village after being hit by a cowherder, which caused the proliferation of anthills in this area.

Demographics 
The official language in Puttaparthi is Telugu. Other common languages spoken in Puttaparthi are Hindi, Kannada, and English. Various national and international languages are understood and spoken due to the presence of national and international devotees.

Geography

Climate 

The hotter months are from March until July and the milder months are from November until January.

The southwest monsoons play a major role in determining the climate. The northeast monsoons are responsible for about one-third of the total rainfall. Some rainfall may be expected during the months of July and August and again from October to December."

Puttaparthi is 475 meters (1558 feet) above sea level.

Transport

Road 
The Andhra Pradesh State Road Transport Corporation (APSRTC) operates bus services from Puttaparthi bus station. People visit Puttaparthi from all over India, and most State transport services also supply buses to Puttaparthi.

Puttaparthi is well connected by road to Anantapur (84 km), Hyderabad, (441 km), Bangalore (154 km), Chennai (529 km) and all parts of Anantapur district.

Rail 

Puttaparthi has a railway station named as Sri Sathya Sai Prasanthi Nilayam. The Railway station was inaugurated and became functional from November 23, 2000, Baba's 74th birthday. It is about 8 km to the west of the ashram. This station falls under the Bangalore Division of the South Western Railway and lies on the Bangalore–Guntakal railway line. It is easy to reach the town from the railway station in 20-25 mins, through various modes of transport like cabs, autorickshaws and APSRTC buses. The town is connected directly by train to Bangalore, Chennai, Hyderabad, Coimbatore, Mumbai, New Delhi, and Kolkata. and Sri Sathya Sai Prasanthi Nilayam railway station is the 5th busiest station in Bangalore division of SWR.

Air 
Puttaparthi Airport is a domestic airport situated in the town.

The nearest International airport is the Kempegowda International Airport at Devanahalli, a suburb of Bangalore which is about 119 km from Puttaparthi.

Sports 
Sri Sathya Sai International Centre for Sports and Sri Sathya Sai Hill View Stadium are two sporting facilities in Puttaparthi. Hill View Stadium was established in 1985 and mainly used cricket and capacity of 50,000 people. International Centre for Sports was established in 2006 with indoor facilities for Basketball, Volleyball, Tennis, Squash, Table Tennis, Badminton, Gymnastics and Yoga/Aerobics.

References

External links 

 
Cities and towns in Sri Sathya Sai district